Taekyeon could refer to the following.
Taekkyeon, a Korean form of traditional martial arts.
Taecyeon, the main rapper of the band 2PM.